Arashan (before 2001: Хивинка Khivinka) is a village in the Talas Region of Kyrgyzstan. It is part of the Talas District. Its population was 1,247 in 2021.

References

Populated places in Talas Region